The Autumn Store Part 2 is an EP by The Field Mice. It was released as a 7" vinyl record.

Track listing
7" Single (SARAH 025)
"Song Six" - 5:01
"Anyone Else Isn't You" - 4:12
"Bleak" - 5:07

1990 EPs
Sarah Records albums
The Field Mice albums